Maurizio Massimiani (born 22 September 1953) is an Italian former professional Grand Prix motorcycle road racer. 

Massimiani was born in Scandriglia, Italy. His best year was in 1979 when he finished second in the 125cc world championship.

References 

1953 births
Sportspeople from the Province of Rieti
Living people
Italian motorcycle racers
125cc World Championship riders
250cc World Championship riders
500cc World Championship riders